The 2017–18 Stade Rennais season was the 116th professional season of the club since its creation in 1901.  During this campaign the club competed in the following competitions: Ligue 1, Coupe de France, Coupe de la Ligue. Rennes had one of their best seasons in recent memory, finishing 5th and qualifying for the 2018-19 Europa League, the club's first European appearance since reaching the qualifying rounds of the 2008-09 UEFA Cup.

Players

Competitions

Ligue 1

League table

Results summary

Results by round

Matches

Coupe de France

Coupe de la Ligue

References

Stade Rennais F.C. seasons
Rennes